As Close As You Think is the twelfth studio album by Kevin Ayers, released on Illuminated Records in 1986. It was his release of newly recorded material in three years.  (His previous studio album Deia...Vu, had been recorded in 1980 but not released until 1984.)

Track listing
 "Stepping Out" (Kevin Ayers, Ollie Halsall) – 4:26
 "Fool After Midnight" (Ayers, Halsall, Zanna Gregmar) – 3:17
 "Wish I Could Fall" (Ayers) – 3:30
 "Only Heaven Knows" (Ayers) – 2:51
 "Too Old to Die Young" (Ayers) – 5:47
 "The Howlin' Man" (Ayers, Halsall) – 4:01
 "Never My Baby" (Ayers) – 4:04
 "Budget Tours (part one)" (Ayers, Halsall) – 7:57
 "Budget Tours (part two)" (Ayers, Halsall) – 2:09

Personnel
Musicians
 Kevin Ayers – lead vocals, rhythm guitar (track 5)
 Ollie Halsall – guitar, backing vocals, lead vocal (track 7)
 Pat Crumly – flute, saxophone
 Poli Palmer – synthesizer, Fairlight programming

Technical
 Ollie Halsall – producer
 Poli Palmer – producer, engineer
 Luc Carson – photography
 Colin Burns – sleeve design

References 

 Original LP sleevenotes

1986 albums
Kevin Ayers albums